The Monnett Mini, also called the Mini Messashidt, was an early John Monnett modification of the Parker Jeanies Teenie.

Design and development
The Mini was based on the JT-1 with a larger chord wing, a fully enclosed cockpit and removable wings. The aircraft was all-metal low-wing single seater with conventional landing gear. The prototype aircraft featured a Messerschmitt paint scheme. Power came from a 1300cc Volkswagen air-cooled engine that would be the basis for most of Monnett's future designs.

Operational history
The Mini was introduced at the Experimental Aircraft Association airshow in 1970. Monnett was not pleased with the aircraft which demonstrated a 1400fpm descent rate power-off. Shortly thereafter built the VW-powered Sonerai I design, introduced in 1971.

Specifications (variant specified)

See also

References

Homebuilt aircraft
Monnett aircraft
1970s United States civil aircraft
Single-engined tractor aircraft
Low-wing aircraft
Aircraft first flown in 1970